These are the results of the men's doubles competition in badminton at the 2004 Summer Olympics in Athens.

Medalists

Seeds

  (second round)
  (quarterfinals)
  (gold medalist)
  (quarterfinals)
  (fourth place)
  (quarterfinals)
  (second round)
  (bronze medalist)

Draw

Finals

Top Half

Bottom Half

References
tournamentsoftware.com

Badminton at the 2004 Summer Olympics
Men's events at the 2004 Summer Olympics